The 14th Parliament of Sri Lanka was a meeting of the Parliament of Sri Lanka, with the membership determined by the results of the 2010 parliamentary election held on 8 and 20 April 2010. The parliament met for the first time on 22 April 2010 and was dissolved on 26 June 2015.

Election

The 14th parliamentary election was held on 8 April and 20 April 2010. The incumbent United People's Freedom Alliance (UPFA) secured a landslide victory in the elections, buoyed by its achievement of ending the 26 year Sri Lankan Civil War by defeating the Liberation Tigers of Tamil Eelam in May 2009. The UPFA won a large majority in parliament, obtaining 144 seats, an increase of 39 since the 13th parliamentary election. The main opposition United National Front (UNF) won 60 seats, a decline of 22. The minority Tamil party Tamil National Alliance (TNA) won 14 seats, a decline of 8, and the Democratic National Alliance (DNA), contesting for the first time, won 7 seats.

Results

The new parliament was sworn in on 22 April 2010. Chamal Rajapaksa, the brother of President Rajapaksa, was elected Speaker, Piyankara Jayaratne as the Deputy Speaker and Murugesu Chandrakumar as the Deputy Chairman of Committees. Ranil Wickremesinghe was recognised as Leaders of the Opposition. John Amaratunga was appointed as the Chief Opposition Whip.

On 2 May 2010 the government appointed Nimal Siripala de Silva as the Leader of the House and Dinesh Gunawardena as the Chief Government Whip.

Chandima Weerakkody was elected Deputy Speaker on 23 November 2010 after his predecessor Piyankara Jayaratne was made a minister.

Government

On 21 April 2010 President Rajapaksa appointed D. M. Jayaratne as the new Prime Minister. The rest of the government, comprising 36 Ministers and 39 Deputy Ministers were sworn in on 23 April 2010. President Rajapaksa has retained control of the important ministries of Defence, Finance & Planning, Highways, and Ports & Aviation.

Mervyn Silva resigned as Deputy Minister of Mass Media & Information on 5 May 2010. A further four Ministers and five Deputy Ministers were sworn in on 5 May 2010. Mervyn Silva was appointed as the new Deputy Minister of Highways. 85 UPFA MPs were now part of the government.

Mervyn Silva was dismissed from his ministerial post and suspended from the SLFP on 10 August 2010. However, a subsequent SLFP disciplinary cleared him of all charges and on 8 September 2010 he was reappointed to his ministerial post.

On 22 November 2010, three days after Rajapaksa was sworn in for his second term, a new government was sworn in. A number of opposition MPs who had defected to the UPFA were rewarded with ministerial posts. A further Minister and three Deputy Ministers were sworn in on 25 November 2010 95 UPFA MPs were now part of the government.

S. M. Chandrasena resigned as Minister of Agrarian Services & Wildlife with effect from 26 September 2012. He was appointed Deputy Minister of Agrarian Services & Wildlife on 5 October 2012.

President Rajapaksa carried out a cabinet re-shuffle on 28 January 2013, appointing some new ministers and deputy ministers. 96 UPFA MPs were now part of the government. Nine new deputy ministers were appointed on 10 October 2013. 105 UPFA MPs were now part of the government (Prime Minister + 10 Senior Ministers + 54 Ministers + 2 Project Ministers + 38 Deputy Ministers (excludes Sarath Amunugama who is also a Senior Minister)).

Deputy Economic Development Minister S. M. Chandrasena was appointed as Cabinet Minister for Special Projects on 23 November 2013. Palani Digambaran and Praba Ganesan were appointed deputy ministers on 21 August 2014. V. Radhakrishnan was appointed deputy minister on 9 October 2014.

Maithripala Sirisena defeated Mahinda Rajapaksa at the 2015 presidential election after which he appointed a UNP dominated national government (NG).

Legislation

2010
 13 July: Appropriation Act
 17 August: Widows' and Orphans' Pension fund (Amendment)
 17 August: Widowers' and Orphans' Pension (Amendment)
 18 August: Judicature (Amendment)
 9 September: 18th Amendment to the Constitution
 5 October: Civil Procedure Code (Amendment)
 6 October: National Institute of Labour Act
 30 October: Provincial Council Act
 3 November: Civil Aviation Act
 7 December: Secretary to the Treasury (Nomination of Representative)
 7 December: Default Taxes (Special Provisions)
 7 December: Casino Business (Regulation)
 7 December: Public Enterprises Reform Commission of Sri Lanka
 10 December: Registration of Deaths
 10 December: Appropriation Act

2011
 28 January: Recovery of Loans by Banks Act
 28 January: Offensive Weapons Act
 7 February: Regulation of Insurance Industry (Amendment)
 23 February: Mediation Boards (Amendment)
 23 February: Protection of the Rights of Elders (Amendment)
 23 February: Rohitha Abeygunawardana Foundation (Incorporation)
 23 February: Tharunyata Hetak Organization (Incorporation)
 22 March: Red Lotus Organization for Humanitarian Services (Incorporation)
 31 March: Value Added Tax (Amendment)
 31 March: Nation Building Tax (Amendment)
 31 March: Economic Service Charge
 31 March: Strategic Development Project
 31 March: Provincial Councils (Transfer of Stamp duty)
 31 March: Debits Tax
 31 March: Finance (Amendment)
 31 March: Regional Infrastructure Development Levy (Repeal)
 31 March: Excise (Special Provisions) (Amendment)
 31 March: Ports and Airports Development Levy
 31 March: Recovery of Loans by Banks (Special Provisions) (Amendment)
 31 March: Excise (Amendment)
 31 March: Telecommunication Levy
 31 March: Inland Revenue (Amendment)

2012
 17 January: Ramakrishna Sarada Mission (Incorporation)
 9 February: Employee's Provident Fund
 15 February: Board of Investment of Sri Lanka (Amendment)
 15 February: Tax Appeals Commission
 21 February: Central Colleges Past Pupils' Association of Sri Lanka (Incorporation)
 8 March: Rahula College Matara
 30 March: Value Added Tex
 30 March: Inland Revenue (Amendment)
 30 March: Nation Building Tax (Amendment)
 30 March: Ports and Airport
 30 March: Economic Service Charge (Amendment)
 30 March: Finance
 4 May: Defence Services Command and Staff College (Amendment)
 6 June: T. B. Ekanayake Foundation (Incorporation)
 11 July: Buddhasravaka Bikku University (Amendment)
 6 August: Organization for the Eraction of Balana Buddha Statue (Incorporation)
 6 August: D. M. Dasanayake Social Serivice and Charity Foundation
 6 August: Dr. Malani Fonseka Foundation
 6 August: Piya Dasuna Foundation
 8 October: Ranaviru Seva Authority (Amendment)
 15 November: Local Authority (Special)
 15 November: Local Authority Election (Amendment)
 8 December: Appropriation Act

2013
 11 January: Divinaguma
 6 February: Code of Criminal Procedure
 12 February: Convention of the suppression of Terrorist Financing
 21 February: Society of the Ceylonese Brothers of St. Joseph
 22 March: Ports and Airports Developments Levy (Amendment)
 22 March: Economic Service Charge (Amendment)
 22 March: Excise (Amendment)
 22 March: Telecommunication Levy (Amendment)
 22 March: Customs (Amendment)
 28 March: Resettlement Authority (Amendment)
 23 April: Nation Building
 23 April: Finance Act
 23 April: Notaries (Amendment)
 23 April: Powers of Attorney
 23 April: Fiscal Management (Responsibility) (Amendment)
 23 April: Strategic Development Projects
 23 April: Value Added Tax
 24 April: Inland Revenue
 24 April: Betting and Gaming Levy (Amendment)
 24 April: Tax Appeals Commission
 24 April: Registration of Documents
 8 May: Marriage Registration (Amendment)
 8 May: Kandyan Marriage and Divorce
 8 May: Muslim Marriage and Divorce (Amendment)
 8 May: Births and Deaths Registration
 21 May: Hanguranketha Madanwala Rajamaha Vihara Development Foundation
 20 June: Registration of Electors (Special Provisions)
 8 July: Parliamentary Scholarship Board (Repeal)
 8 July: Defence Services Command and Staff College (Amendment)
 12 July: Local Authorities filling of vacancies
 7 August: Sri Lanka Electricity (Amendment)
 25 October: Science and Technology Development (Amendment)
 11 November: Convention Against Doping in Sport
 11 November: Buddhist Temporalities (Amendment)
 22 November: Fisheries and Aquatic Resources (Amendment)
 20 December: Appropriation

2014
 6 February: Institute of Policy Studies of Sri Lanka (Amendment)
 21 February: National Institute of Business Management (Amendment)
 4 March: Institute of Geology, Sri Lanka (Incorporation)
 4 March: Philip Gunawardena Commemorative Society (Incorporation)
 4 March: Chandima Weerakkody Foundation (Incorporation)
 10 April: Medical (Amendment)
 24 April: Value Added Tax
 24 April: Inland Revenue (Amendment)
 24 April: Economic Service Charge (Amendment)
 24 April: Nation Building Tax (Amendment)
 24 April: Telecommunication Levy (Amendment)
 24 April: Special Commodity Levy (Amendment)
 24 April: Companies Act (Amendment)
 24 April: Default Taxes (Special Provisions) (Amendment)
 24 April: Monetary Law (Amendment)
 24 April: Samastha Lanka Sasanarakshaka Mandalaya (Incorporation)
 24 April: The Rehabilitation of Buddhist Temples Foundation (Incorporation)
 4 June: National Enterprise Development Authority (Amendment)
 17 June: Kumarasiri Hettige Foundation (Incorporation)
 17 June: Mohan Lal Grero Foundation (Incorporation)
 17 June: Victor Antony Foundation (Incorporation)
 23 July: Dampe, Meegoda, Bodhiwardhanarama Sri Madurasama PirivenaViharastha Sanwardhana Sabhawa (Incorporation)
 23 July: Nimal Siripala De Silva Foundation (Incorporation)
 23 July: Lakshman Wasantha Perera Community Development Foundation (Incorporation)
 8 August: Institute of Fundamental Studies, Sri Lanka (Amendment)
 8 August: Prescription (Amendment)
 20 August: John Seneviratne Foundation (Incorporation)
 21 August: Bodirajarama Educational and Cultural Founcation (Incorporation)
 21 August: Vasantha Senanayake Foundation (Incorporation)
 21 August: Roman Catholic Archbishop and Bishops of Ceylon (Amendment)
 7 September: Ocean University of Sri Lanka
 7 September: Piyasena Gamage Foundation (Incorporation)
 16 October: Construction Industry Development Act
 23 October: Municipal Councils (Amendment)

2014 (continued)
 23 October: Urban Councils (Amendment)
 23 October: Pradeshiya Sabhas (Amendment)
 23 October: Local Authorities filling of vacancies (Special Provisions) (Amendment)
 29 October: Land (Restrictions on Alienation)
 1 November: DFCC Bank (Repeal and Consequential Provisions)
 4 November: Sri Lanka Atomic Energy
 24 November: Appropriation
 24 November: Kalpawaruksha Development Foundation (Incorporation)
 24 November: Sivmuni Se Vehera Buddhist Foundation (Incorporation)
 24 November: P. Harrison Community Development Foundation (Incorporation)
 24 November: Welfare Society of the School for the Mentally SubnormalChild (Incorporation) (Amendment)
 24 November: Sri Lanka Association of Professional Social Workers (Incorporation)
 25 November: Appropriation (Amendment)
2015
 7 February: Appropriation (Amendment)
 2 March: Fisheries and Aquatic Resources (Amendment)
 3 March: National Authority on Tobacco and Alcohol (Amendment)
 7 March: Assistance to and Protection of Victims of Crime and Witnesses
 19 March: National Medicines Regulatory Authority
 15 May: 19th Amendment to the Constitution
 3 June: Immigrants & Emigrants (Amendment)

Composition

Light shading indicates majority (113 seats or more); dark shading indicates two-thirds majority (150 seats or more); no shading indicates minority government.
 22 April 2010 - National Union of Workers (NUW) left the United National Front alliance after a dispute over National List seats. Palani Digambaran, their sole MP, is to function as an independent MP.
 4 August 2010 - Sri Lanka Freedom Party (People's wing) dissolved. Its sole MP Mangala Samaraweera joined the United National Party on 6 August 2010.
 5 August 2010 - Palani Digambaran of the NUW and Praba Ganesan of the Democratic People's Front (DPF) cross over to the UPFA. It was reported that Ganesan was suspended from the DPF.
 27 August 2010 - Sri Lanka Muslim Congress (SLMC) decides to support the government on constitutional changes, including removing the two-term limit on the presidency, whilst remaining in opposition. The SLMC's eight MPs will give the government the two-thirds majority needed in Parliament to amend the constitution.
 8 September 2010 - Six United National Party (UNP) MPs (A. R. M. Abdul Cader, Earl Gunasekara, Manusha Nanayakkara, Lakshman Senewiratne, Upeksha Swarnamali and Nimal Senarath Wijesinghe) cross over to the UPFA during the 18th amendment debate. They were suspended from the UNP.
 8 September 2010 - Tamil National Alliance MP Podiappuhamy Piyasena joins the UPFA.
 11 September 2010 - V. Radhakrishnan quits the Ceylon Workers' Congress (CWC) to sit as an independent MP supporting UPFA.
 7 October 2010 - V. Radhakrishnan joins the Up-Country People's Front (UCPF).
 22 November 2010 - SLMC (eight MPs) joins UPFA. The SLMC's High Command had decided on 12 November 2010 to join the UPFA.
 24 December 2010 - Achala Jagodage is expelled from the National Freedom Front.
 30 November 2011 - UNP MP Mohan Lal Grero crosses over to the ruling UPFA. He is rewarded by being appointed Monitoring MP for the Ministry of Education.
 15 November 2012 - DNA MP Ajith Kumara becomes an independent MP. Kumara had been suspended from the JVP in 2011 for supporting the breakaway group (subsequently called the Frontline Socialist Party).
 8 August 2013 - Perumal Rajadurai quits the CWC to sit as an independent MP supporting UPFA.
 18 November 2014 - Jathika Hela Urumaya (JHU) (three MPs) leaves UPFA.
 20 November 2014 - UPFA MP Wasantha Senanayake joins the UNP.
 21 November 2014 - UPFA minister Maithripala Sirisena resigns from the UPFA government to contest the presidential election. He is joined by five other UPFA MPs - Duminda Dissanayake, M. K. D. S. Gunawardena, Rajitha Senaratne and Rajiva Wijesinha.
 21 November 2014 - Perumal Rajadurai resigns from the UPFA. He joins the UNP on 25 November 2014.
 26 November 2014 - UPFA MP Hunais Farook joins the UNP.
 30 November 2014 - UPFA MP Navin Dissanayake resigns from the UPFA.
 8 December 2014 - UNP MP Tissa Attanayake and Democratic Party MP Jayantha Ketagoda join the UPFA. Attanayake is rewarded by being appointed Minister of Health on 11 December 2014.
 10 December 2014 - Palani Digambaran and V. Radhakrishnan resign from the UPFA.
 22 December 2014 - All Ceylon Muslim Congress (ACMC) (two MPs) leaves UPFA. The third ACMC MP (M. L. Alim Mohammad Hisbullah) remains in the government.
 28 December 2014 - SLMC (eight MPs) leaves UPFA.
 31 December 2014 - Faiszer Musthapha resigns from the UPFA.
 1 January 2015 - Nandimithra Ekanayake resigns from the UPFA.
 17 March 2015 - Rajiva Wijesinha leaves the national government and crosses over to the opposition.
 18 March 2015 - Arjuna Ranatunga joins the SLFP.
 22 March 2015 - 27 UPFA MPs, mostly from the SLFP, join the national government.
 2 April 2015 - Deputy Minister Tissa Karalliyadde leaves the national government.
 5 April 2015 - UPFA MP P. Dayaratna joined UNP in Ampara.
 21 May 2015 - One cabinet minister and three state ministers leave the national government.
 29 May 2015 - Three UPFA MPs join the national government.
 10 June 2015 - Four UPFA MPs join the national government.

Members

Deaths and resignations
The 14th parliament saw the following deaths and resignations:
 7 October 2010 - Sarath Fonseka (DNA-COL) vacated his seat after being sentenced to 30 months imprisonment by a court martial after being found guilty of breaching arms procurement guideline. His replacement Jayantha Ketagoda (DNA-COL) was sworn in on 8 March 2011.
 2 December 2010 - Noordeen Mashoor (UPFA-VAN) died. His replacement Muthali Bawa Farook (UPFA-VAN) was sworn in on 5 January 2011.
 24 September 2012 - Malini Fonseka (UPFA-NAT) resigned. She was sworn in again on 9 October 2012.
 30 May 2013 - Jayalath Jayawardena (UNP-GAM) died. His replacement Ajith Mannapperuma (UNP-GAM) was sworn in on 4 June 2013.
 24 July 2013 - Dayasiri Jayasekara (UNP-KUR) resigns to contest the North Western provincial council elections. His replacement Nalin Bandara Jayamaha (UNP-KUR) was sworn in on 8 August 2013.
 5 August 2014 - Harin Fernando (UNP-BAD) resigns to contest the Uva provincial council elections. His replacement K. Velayudam (UNP-BAD) was sworn in on 8 August 2014.
 28 November 2014 - A. H. M. Azwer (UPFA-NAT) resigns to allow an All Ceylon Makkal Congress member to be appointed. His replacement Ameer Ali (UPFA-NAT) was sworn in on 12 December 2014.
 9 January 2015 - Maithripala Sirisena (UPFA-POL) resigned to take up presidency. His replacement Jayasinghe Bandara (UPFA-POL) was sworn in on 29 January 2015.
 12 May 2015 - Neranjan Wickramasinghe (UPFA-KUR) died. His replacement R. D. Wimaladasa (UPFA-KUR) was sworn in on 20 May 2015.

List

Notes

References

Sources

 
 
 
 
 
 
 
 
 
 
 
 
 
 
 
 
 
 
 
 

Parliament of Sri Lanka
2010 Sri Lankan parliamentary election
2010 establishments in Sri Lanka